La Fortuna Waterfall (Spanish for "the fortune") is in central Costa Rica, in the Alajuela Province. In Spanish, it is known as Catarata Fortuna. The waterfall drops about 70−75 meters and is at the base of the dormant Chato volcano, about 5.5 km outside of the town of La Fortuna, near the Arenal Volcano. It is fed by the Fortuna River, which travels through the rain forest in the Arenal Mountain range until it plunges over the cliff, forming this waterfall.

The admission is US$18 for adults and $18 for children over 8. The paved hike down to the waterfall is over 500 steps along a staircase carved into the hillside. It takes about 10-20 minutes, and there are places to stop and sit if needed. Guests are encouraged to swim in the stream and small rapids below the falls, and there's a lifeguard on duty. There are restrooms and showers in the guest facilities atop the cliff, along with a restaurant and gift shop. It should take 10 minutes to go down and about 20 to get back up to the parking lot. Open from 7:30 am to 4:00 pm.

References

External links 

 

Waterfalls of Costa Rica
Geography of Alajuela Province
Tourist attractions in Alajuela Province